Didcot is a rural locality in the North Burnett Region, Queensland, Australia. In the  Didcot had a population of 60 people.

Geography 
The now-closed Mungar-Monto railway line passed through Didcot from west to east with two now-abandonded railway stations serving the locality:

 Didcot railway station in the west of the locality 
 Chowey railway station in the east of the locality.
Didcot has the following mountains:

 Mount Melville 
 Mount Shamrock 
Mount Shamrock is a former mining town in the north-east of the locality, immediately south of the mountain of the same name.

History 
Degilbo at that time was known as Woowoonga.

Mount Shamrock Provisional School opened on 24 February 1890, closing circa 1894. The school reopened on 7 April 1896 as Mount Shamrock Provisional School. On 1 January 1909, it became Mount Shamrock State School. It closed circa 1935.

Didcot Provisional School opened on 23 November 1908. On 1 January 1909, it became Didcot State School. It closed in 1967.

In the 2011 census, Didcot had a population of 287 people.

In the  Didcot had a population of 60 people.

Heritage listings 

Didcot has a number of heritage-listed sites, including:
 Chowey Cemetery Road, off Gooroolba Biggenden Road: Chowey Cemetery (also known as Mount Shamrock Cemetery)
 on the Mungar-Monto railway line: Deep Creek Railway Bridge
Engineers Australia listed on their Official Register of Engineering Heritage Markers:

 Degilbo-Mundubbera Railway Bridges in October 2016.  A total of 12 bridges that are situated on the Mungar Junction to Monto railway line, including the Deep Creek Railway Bridge, are recognized with one Engineering Heritage Marker representing the "best example of a collection of historic railway bridges in Australia".

Economy
There are a number of homesteads in the locality:

 Avalon
 Bibaringa
 Brahman Pk
 Danebo
 Nora Creina
 Plum Tree
 Warra Creek

Education
There are no schools in Didcot. The nearest primary schools are Coalstoun Lakes State School in neighbouring Coalstoun Lakes to the south and Biggenden State School in neighbouring Biggenden to the south-east. The nearest secondary schools are Biggenden State School (to Year 10) and Burnett State College (to Year 12) in Gayndah to the south-west.

References

External links 

North Burnett Region
Localities in Queensland